The GiMA Best Engineer – Theatre Mix is given by Global Indian Music Academy as a part of its annual Global Indian Music Academy Awards. The category being introduced in 2010, has not been awarded since 2012.

List of winners
 2010: Bishwadeep Chatterjee and Anup Dev – 3 Idiots
 2011: Leslie Fernandes – Dabangg
 Alok De – Udaan
 Ajay Kumar – Patiala House
 Leslie Fernandes – Housefull
 Anuj Mathur – Band Baaja Baaraat

See also
 Bollywood
 Cinema of India

References

Global Indian Music Academy Awards